Hal Le Roy (born John LeRoy Schotte, December 10, 1913 – May 2, 1985) was an American dancer, actor, and singer appearing on stage, in film, and on television.

Life and career
Le Roy was born John LeRoy Schotte in Cincinnati, Ohio, on December 10, 1913.

He broke into New York theater as a dancer. His dancing teacher, Ned Wayburn, got him his first job, in Hoboken Hoboes in 1928. He quickly worked his way into Broadway roles, where his dance style created a sensation in the 1931 Ziegfeld Follies. On April 12, 1934, he married Ruth Hedwig Dod (March 13, 1911 – July 1, 1979), who had been one of his dance partners.

He also began doing a series of musical film shorts for Vitaphone and Warner Brothers Pictures. Aside from his work on Broadway and in film, he performed in revues and vaudeville and as a featured entertainer in New York's nightclub scene. He was selected as a feature performer by Bob Hope for Hope's TV Premier appearance.

Le Roy died on May 2, 1985, in Hackensack, New Jersey, of complications following heart surgery. He left no survivors.

In 2021 Le Roy was inducted posthumously into the International Tap Dance Hall of Fame

Broadway
 The Gang's All Here (1931)
 Ziegfeld Follies of 1931 (1931)
 Strike Me Pink (1933)
 Thumbs Up! (1934–1935)
 Too Many Girls (1939–1940)  
 Count Me In (1942)

Complete filmographyThe High School Hoofer (1931 short) as Hal Le RoyTip Tap Toe (1932 short) as Hal EvansThe Way of All Freshmen (1933 short) as HalUse Your Imagination (1933 short) as HalMr. Broadway (1933) as Hal Le RoyPicture Palace (1934 short) as HalHollywood Newsreel (1934 short) as Himself (uncredited)Wonder Bar (1934) as dancer in blackfaceHarold Teen (1934) as Harold TeenPrivate Lessons (1934 short) as Hal Le RoySyncopated City (1934 short) as Hal Le RoyIn the Spotlight (1935 short) as HalMain Street Follies (1935 short) as HalOh, Evaline! (1935 short) as HalWash Your Step (1936 short) as Hal RogersRhythmitis (1936 short) as HalSwing for Sale (1937 short)Ups and Downs (1937 short) as Hal SmithStart Cheering (1938) as 'Tarzan' BiddleThe Prisoner of Swing (1938 short) as Rudolph, King of Sulvania, and Mr. RazzenstillThe Knight Is Young (1938 short) as HalPublic Jitterbug No. 1 (1939 short) as Hal SturgesToo Many Girls (1940) as Al TerwilligerThe Star-Spangled Revue'' (1950 TV movie) as Himself

References

External links
 
 
 
 Steppin' Hal: Book 2, 1933-1946, held by the Billy Rose Theatre Division, New York Public Library for the Performing Arts

1913 births
1985 deaths
Male actors from Cincinnati
American male film actors
American male television actors
American male stage actors
American male dancers
American tap dancers
Vaudeville performers
20th-century American male actors
Eccentric dancers
20th-century American dancers